ZALA Aero Group (also called A-Level Aerosystems) is a Russian company specialising in unmanned aerial vehicle (UAV) development, located in Izhevsk, Russia. ZALA Aero has provided UAV systems for several sectors of the Russian government, including the Ministry of Defence, and has also won contracts to supply UAVs to foreign countries. The company's in-house design and production projects include a variety of systems related to UAV design, manufacture and operation, including autopilots, airframes, mechanical and pneumatic catapults, launchers, payloads and communication technologies. ZALA Aero is the only Russian company producing unmanned helicopters, portable anti-drone EW systems and a VTOL drone.

Company 
The company is a subsidiary of Kalashnikov Concern.

Products 
The ZALA 421-06 is an unmanned helicopter. 

The ZALA 421-08 and ZALA 421-12 UAV are conventional UAVs.

The ZALA 421-16E5G is an unmanned aircraft outfitted with a hybrid powerplant combining an electric motor and an internal combustion engine.

The ZALA 421-24 is Russia's first quadcopter, which the company claims is invulnerable to electronic warfare systems.

The KUB-BLA is military UAV that can loiter over a combat area for an extended period and allegedly identifies targets using artificial intelligence. It has a  wingspan. It is fired from a portable launcher. It crashes into its target and detonates a  explosive. The complex with loitering ammunition "KUB-BLA" has successfully passed state tests and is recommended for adoption by the Russian army at the end of 2021.

The ZALA Lancet is a further development of the KUB-BLA. It consists of two versions: bigger Lancet-3 and smaller Lancet-1.

History 
ZALA Aero was founded in 2003 by Aleksandr Zakharov, Its first production UAV went to the Russian Ministry of Internal Affairs in 2006. In addition to providing aircraft for defense and military purposes, the company markets its products to the energy sector, and has contracted with Gazprom to provide UAVs to monitor over 2,000 km of the company's pipeline network. ZALA Aero has worked with Gazprom's Space Systems division to use UAVs to transmit real-time video over satellite channels.

In 2008, the ZALA 421-06 and the ZALA 421-08 completed test-flying and entered operational service. The aircraft were trialled aboard an icebreaker, participating in reconnaissance to assist the ship's work. As of 2021, ZALA 421-08 is used by scientists in the Antarctic. In 2009, ZALA Aero reached an agreement with Turkmenistan's Ministry of Internal Affairs to supply the country with the ZALA 421-12 UAV system.

As of 2019 Russia operated over one thousand ZALA drones. In 2019, ZALA Aero developed an unmanned aerial vehicle (UAV)-borne detection system that employs artificial intelligence (AI) technology to recognise objects. 

In 2021, ZALA Aero launched into serial production the ZALA 421-16E5G and developed the ZALA 421-24.

In November 2021, “ZALA Aero Group” signed a contract with Panamian “UAV Latam” for a supply of seven UAV systems in 2022-23 on eight local markets of “UAV Latam”. The company will help with the construction of a UAV training center as well as the preparation of local operations and other technical specialists.

The KUB-BLA UAV was demonstrated in 2019. In March 2022, it was reportedly deployed in the Russo-Ukrainian War.

See also 
Aircraft industry of Russia
Defence industry of Russia

References

External links 
Company website

Unmanned aerial vehicle manufacturers
Aircraft manufacturers of Russia
Kalashnikov Concern
Russian companies established in 2003
Companies based in Udmurtia
Russian brands
Vehicle manufacturing companies established in 2003